The Cummeragunja walk-off in 1939 was a protest by Aboriginal Australians at the Cummeragunja Station, an Aboriginal reserve in southern New South Wales.

Background
The Cummeragunja Mission was mostly home to Yorta Yorta people who had been relocated in the late 19th century from the Maloga Mission. In January 1935, according to W.B. Payne, a Church of Christ missionary, Christian churches were indifferent and neglecting Aboriginal people at the mission, "While thousands of pounds were being raised for missions in foreign countries the aborigines in Australia were regarded as outcasts". Over the years, the New South Wales government had tightened its control on the operation of the mission. By late 1938 people had become unhappy with the management of the mission, living conditions and restrictions on their movement.

Protest
On 4 February 1939, when Jack Patten was arrested and removed from the mission after trying to address the local people, as many as 200 residents of the Cummeragunja Mission walked out of the mission and crossed the Murray River, leaving the state of New South Wales. This was in contravention of rules set by the New South Wales Board for the Protection of Aborigines.

Activist Bill Onus put off his potential career as a budding actor to return from Melbourne to his place of birth for the walk-off.

Legacy

Many of the people who left the mission in February 1939 settled in northern Victoria in towns such as Barmah, Echuca and Shepparton.

The walk-off was one of the first mass protests by Indigenous Australians, and had significant impact on events that followed later, such the 1967 referendum.

The third episode of the 1981 miniseries, Women of the Sun, is a fictional story based on the walk-off.

In October 2010, the opera Pecan Summer, based on the walk-off, opened in Mooroopna, near Shepparton. Deborah Cheetham – whose uncle Jimmy Little was born at Cummeragunja Mission – wrote, composed and performed in this production by the Short Black Opera Company.

In 2020, Ross Morgan, a Yorta Yorta man, designed the Collingwood Football Club's Indigenous guernsey which was worn against North Melbourne in round 13 as part of the Australian Football League's Sir Doug Nicholls round tradition. According to Morgan, the walk-off is still strongly remembered by those who were involved and their descendants.

References

Indigenous Australian politics
Australian Aboriginal cultural history
Protests in Australia
1939 in Australia
1939 protests
1930s in New South Wales
Riverina